The men's sanda 56 kilograms competition at the 2018 Asian Games in Jakarta, Indonesia was held from 19 August to 23 August at the JIExpo Kemayoran Hall B3.

Schedule
All times are Western Indonesia Time (UTC+07:00)

Results
Legend
PD — Won by gap point

Final

Top half

Bottom half

References

External links
Official website

Men's sanda 56 kg